In agriculture, estrous synchronization is used (particularly in the dairy and beef industries) to facilitate breeding by artificial insemination.

Background
The term “estrus” refers to the phase of the estrous cycle  in which a sexually mature, non-pregnant female is receptive to sexual advances from the male³. Ovulation occurs at approximately this time. Estrous synchronisation is the process of targeting female mammals to come to heat within a short time frame (36 to 96 hours). This is achieved through the use of one or more hormones. Methods to improve our ability to synchronize the reproductive process and result in the ‘timed insemination’ without the detection of heat have been developed. These include the “Synch” protocols that involve the application of GnRH and PGF2α in various combinations. These “Synch” protocols may include: Select Synch, OvSynch, CoSynch, and Modified Select Synch  The synchronization of the estrous cycle is commonly used in different industries, such as Dairy and Beef cattle. Synchronization allows these industries to improve management and nutrition of the cattle, while also decreasing expenses.

Method

Research has been conducted into different ways farmers can perform estrous synchronization such as progesterone injections or a Progesterone Releasing Intra-vaginal Device [PRID]. The PRID is a sponge that is inserted into the vagina of a cow to stop the natural estrous cycle (for it acts as a corpus luteum), because progesterone is the hormone that signals the body to stop the cycle because fertilisation has occurred. When the sponge is removed the cycle restarts. This apparatus is useful in manipulating the cycle so that multiple cows can be ovulated around the same time. Other methods use injections of GnRH or PGF2a at certain points over the course of a few weeks to simulate the body’s natural production of these compounds. This is a more exact but time consuming way to manipulate the cycle of multiple cows to sync up the timing of A.I.  Estrus synchronisation has major advantages in making artificial insemination more practical. Increasing the productivity of embryo transfer and artificial insemination is economically profitable as the costs associated with veterinarian and semen services are reduced.
The reduction of costs occur because vets are required for less time to do the inseminating because the period of ovulation of the herd is decreased to 2-5 days. There are many different injection methods that have been put into practise in order to manipulate the estrous cycle. These involve injections into each cow with a measured amount of progesterone or progestin and waiting 5-7 days, or until heat signals occur, before moving onto different impregnating methods such as joining the cows or heifers with a bull.

Agricultural applications

Milk is a product of great demand all year round. As a result of this demand, farmers have been given an incentive to produce milk during winter months. In order to achieve this public demand for milk, dairy farmers needed to change their breeding routines. estrous synchronization enabled this change in the herd’s breeding routine to allow dairy farmers to produce milk for human consumption year round. Case studies for the productivity of these incentives on dairy farms have shown to have positive results.
Oestrus synchronisation has proven to have many advantages in the dairy and beef industries. The application of estrous synchronisation enables the farmer to reduce costs involved in the hire of AI technicians and semen import. Concentrated calving and uniform weaning saves time and is cheaper than having individual cows in heat throughout the year.
However, there are also disadvantages with estrous synchronisation. It requires a high level of management and skills to be able to manage numerous calving operations at a synchronised time. Furthermore, maintaining nutrition and herd health are major factors when it comes to the achieving optimum reproductive performance through estrous synchronisation.

References 

Theriogenology
Dairy farming
Artificial insemination